The 2019 Tennis Championships of Honolulu was a professional tennis tournament played on outdoor hard courts. It was the second edition of the tournament which was part of the 2019 ITF Women's World Tennis Tour. It took place in Honolulu, United States between 8 and 14 July 2019.

Singles main-draw entrants

Seeds

 1 Rankings are as of 1 July 2019.

Other entrants
The following players received wildcards into the singles main draw:
  Kelly Chen
  Whitney Osuigwe
  Natasha Subhash
  Alyssa Tobita

The following players received entry from the qualifying draw:
  Fatma Al-Nabhani
  Vladica Babić
  Sophie Chang
  Alycia Parks
  Giuliana Olmos
  Michika Ozeki
  Chanel Simmonds
  Sophia Whittle

Champions

Singles

 Usue Maitane Arconada def.  Nicole Gibbs, 6–0, 6–2

Doubles

 Hayley Carter /  Jamie Loeb def.  Usue Maitane Arconada /  Caroline Dolehide, 6–4, 6–4

References

External links
 2019 Tennis Championships of Honolulu at ITFtennis.com
 Official website

2019 ITF Women's World Tennis Tour
2019 in American tennis
Tennis tournaments in Hawaii
Tennis Championships of Honolulu
2019 in sports in Hawaii